Relative value may refer to:
Relative value (economics)
Relative value (philosophy)
Relative Value Units in healthcare systems